Rat tribe is a neologism used to describe low income migrant workers who live in underground accommodations within Chinese cities. Official estimates are of 281,000 people living in Beijing's underground, although estimates of up to one million have also been widely reported.

Background
Housing policy dating back to the early stages of the Cold War instigated the incorporation of basement air raid shelters into newly built residential buildings. Encouraged by Deng Xiaoping's economic reforms, migrant workers began emigrating from rural areas to more urban ones, lured by the benefits of higher salaries and standards of living. To accommodate the population surge, the Chinese government permitted the use of these shelters as residences. Without a valid residential permit many migrants were unable to afford the cost of purchasing their own home on arrival and instead turned towards these low cost rooms.

In late 2010, the term "鼠族" began being used to describe underground dwellers in the Chinese press. Shortly after, the Ministry of Housing and Urban-Rural Development formally banned residential rentals of basements and air raid shelters due to safety concerns. By early 2015, state media had reported that 120,000 people had been evicted from underground residences.

Accommodation
While still illegal, many migrant workers choose to live in these centrally located conditions to avoid a longer commute to their workplace. Hygiene conditions in these residences are generally poor, with shared communal facilities. In one instance, people across 80 rooms had access to a single toilet.

See also
Ant tribe
Mole people
Underground city

References

2010 neologisms
Air raid shelters
Economic inequality
Mice and rats in popular culture
Migrant workers
Poverty in China
Social class in China
Subterranea (geography)